The Howell Observatory is an astronomical observatory owned and operated by  Mississippi State University's Astronomy and Physics department.  It is located in Starkville, Mississippi.

Equipment
14" Schmidt-Cassegrain 
8" Schmidt-Cassegrain 
10" Newtonian reflector

See also
 List of observatories

References

External links
Howell Observatory Clear Sky Clock Forecasts of observing conditions.

Astronomical observatories in Mississippi
Buildings and structures in Oktibbeha County, Mississippi
Education in Oktibbeha County, Mississippi
Mississippi State University